Roy A. Clouser is professor emeritus of the College of New Jersey. He has served as professor of philosophy, religion, and logic at the college since 1968. He serves as the resident philosopher of Christian Leaders Institute.

Clouser earned his BA from Gordon College (Massachusetts), a BD from Reformed Episcopal Seminary, and an MA and PhD from the University of Pennsylvania.  His philosophy PhD from the University of Pennsylvania was received in 1972 for his dissertation entitled Transcendental Critique, Ontological Reduction, and Religious Belief in the Philosophy of Herman Dooyeweerd.

Contribution 
Clouser wrote The Myth of Religious Neutrality, where he contextualized Herman Dooyeweerd's philosophy into the general audience of American academic dialogue at the College of New Jersey.  Bruce C Wearne (BA, MSocSci, PhD), Member, Editorial Board, The American Sociologist wrote,Clouser's long-term academic involvement in the American academy has given an encouraging demonstration that a biblically-directed Christian scholarship is possible within academic institutions that cannot avoid reflecting the secularised presumptions of a post-modern, post-humanist pagan society

Philosophic Theory Making 
Clouser built on Dr Herman Dooyeweerd's theory of reality. Clouser cites Dooyeweerd's aspects of reality with these categories

 Fiduciary
 Ethical
 Justitial
 Aesthetic
 Economic 
 Social
 Linguistic
 Historical
 Logical
 Sensory
 Biotic 
 Physical
 Kinetic
 Spatial
 Quantitative

Clouser said about these aspects of reality:I will call these kinds of properties and laws “aspects” of the things we experience, and I am going to refer to the disciplines devoted to their study  as “sciences.” The term “aspect” will serve to emphasize that the kinds are exhibited by, and (indirectly) extracted from, the objects of our pre-theoretical experience. The term “science” will mean any specific discipline, delimited by one or more aspects, in which theories are constructed.

The list above should not be understood as a dogmatic pronouncement about whether these aspects are all genuine, since there are thinkers who would offer a somewhat different list. Rather, it is intended, first, as a description of (not a theory about) the way we come to experience properties of things in isolation as well as in their connectedness in objects. And second, it is a report of the list of aspects most thinkers have regarded as genuine fields for investigation and theory making. The list, then, is only intended to help us understand the major branches of present-day theory making, not to arrive at the one true list of genuine aspects of the world. So from now on when I use such expressions as “aspects of things,” or “aspects of the world,” or “aspects of our experience,” these expressions must be understood to refer to aspects in the same way the list does.

Publications 
 The Myth of Religious Neutrality (University of Notre Dame Press, Notre Dame, 1st edn 1991; 2nd edn 2005).
 Knowing with the Heart (IVP, Downers Grove, 1999; 2nd edn Wipf and Stock, 2007).

External links 
Clouser, Roy A. An Excerpt from The Myth of Religious Neutrality
Roy Clouser pages: articles; books
Wearne, Bruce C. "Philosophy as Dependable Analysis: Roy Clouser's Contribution to Christian Scholarship"
The College of New Jersey: Faculty Profiles

References 

American philosophers
Calvinist and Reformed philosophers
Gordon College (Massachusetts) alumni
Living people
The College of New Jersey faculty
University of Pennsylvania alumni
Year of birth missing (living people)